William Hanna (1910–2001) was an American animator, director, producer and cartoon artist.

William or Bill Hanna may also refer to:
William B. Hanna (1866–1930), American sportswriter
William S. Hanna (1923–1994), Howard County Maryland politician
William T. Hanna (1920–1942), U.S. Marine
Bill Hanna (1930–2016), politician
William Hanna (minister) (1808–1882), Scottish theological writer and biographer 
William Hanna (railroad president) (born 1827), namesake of Hanna City, Illinois, U.S.
William Fahmy Hanna (born 1928), Egyptian Olympic athlete
William John Hanna (1862–1919), lawyer and political figure in Ontario, Canada
William Selim Hanna (1896–1980), Egyptian Minister of Housing

See also
William Hannah (1867–1942), cricket umpire
Willie Hannah (1921–1978), Scottish footballer
William W. Hannan (1854–1917), Detroit real estate developer